Livet är nu is a 1988 studio album from Swedish dansband Roosarna, with Kikki Danielsson.

Track listing

Side A
Santo Domingo
Livet är nu
Din natt
En man med många drömmar
Guld & diamanter
Jag har hittat hem

Side B
Du och jag
Kärlekens spion
Jag är fri
11 23 22 2, 54
Jag ser dej varje dag
Kärleken är min

References 

1988 albums
Roosarna albums